Corpus Christi Catholic Secondary School (also called "Corpus Christi" or simply "Corpus") is an educational Catholic secondary school in Burlington, Ontario, Canada. Located in the Orchard Park area of North Burlington, Corpus Christi Catholic Secondary School has established a reputation for excellence in Catholic education.

The school name, in Latin, Corpus Christi, celebrates the Feast of the Body of Christ or the Eucharist. It remembers and honours the institution of Sacrament of Holy Communion at the Last Supper, and is celebrated on the Sunday following Trinity Sunday.

Athletics
Sports teams at the school include:
Alpine skiing
Badminton
Baseball
Basketball (Midget, Junior, Senior)
Cross country
Field hockey
Football (Junior, Senior)
Girls rugby
Golf (Varsity)
Hockey
Lacrosse
Soccer
Tennis
Track and field
Volleyball

Notable alumni
 Simisola Shittu (born 1999), British-born Canadian basketball player for Ironi Ness Ziona of the Israeli Basketball Premier League

See also
List of high schools in Ontario

References

Burlington Mall's 2010 EcoHeroes
Halton Catholic District School Board News
https://secondary.hcdsb.org/corpuschristi/contact/staff-directory/

External links

High schools in Burlington, Ontario
Catholic secondary schools in Ontario
Educational institutions established in 2008
2008 establishments in Ontario